B. S. Saroja (born 18 November 1929) is an Indian actress in Malayalam and Tamil films. She is the daughter of Johnson, who acted in the first Malayalam film, Vigathakumaran. She acted with MGR and Sivaji in their only movie together, Koondukkili.

Personal life
She was born to Johnson and Rajalakshmi at Thiruvananthapuram in 1929. She studied till fourth grade. Then she joined a circus company, with which she traveled all over India. Then she acted in a Tamil movie as a junior artist. Jeevitha Nouka was her first Malayalam movie. She went on to act many movies after that.

Partial filmography

References

External links

B. S. Saroja at MSI
Article on B. S. Saroja

Actresses from Thiruvananthapuram
Actresses in Malayalam cinema
Indian film actresses
20th-century Indian actresses
1929 births
Living people
Actresses in Tamil cinema
Actresses in Telugu cinema
20th-century Indian dancers
Indian female dancers
Dancers from Kerala
20th-century Indian women artists
Women artists from Kerala
Artists from Thiruvananthapuram